Omiodes localis is a moth of the family Crambidae. It is endemic to the Hawaiian islands of Kauai, Oahu, Molokai, Maui, Lanai and Hawaii.

The larvae feed on Digitaria pruriens, Oplismenus compositus, Paspalum conjugatum and occasionally on sugarcane.

External links

Moths described in 1879
Endemic moths of Hawaii
localis